Guilty Pleasures is the tenth studio album by Quiet Riot released in 2001. It was produced jointly by John Rollo and Quiet Riot. It is the last to feature guitarist Carlos Cavazo and bassist Rudy Sarzo as official members, though Sarzo later appeared as a guest performer on the band's 2014 studio album Quiet Riot 10 and he eventually rejoined the band in 2021.

Track listing

Credits

Quiet Riot
Kevin DuBrow - lead vocals
Carlos Cavazo - guitars
Rudy Sarzo - bass
Frankie Banali - drums

References

Quiet Riot albums
2001 albums